Gary Giddins (born 1948) is an American jazz critic and author. He wrote for The Village Voice from 1973; his "Weather Bird" column ended in 2003. In 1986 Gary Giddins and John Lewis created the American Jazz Orchestra which presented concerts using a jazz repertory with musicians such as Tony Bennett.

For five years, Giddins was the executive director of the Leon Levy Center for Biography at the Graduate Center of the City University of New York.

Selected works

Books
Riding on a Blue Note (1981)
Rhythm-a-ning (1985)
Celebrating Bird (1987)
Satchmo (1988)
Faces in the Crowd (1992)
Visions of Jazz: The First Century (1998)
Bing Crosby: A Pocketful of Dreams - The Early Years, 1903-1940 (2001)
Weather Bird (2004)
Natural Selection (2006)
Jazz (2009)
Warning Shadows: Home Alone with Classic Cinema (2010)
Bing Crosby: Swinging on a Star - The War Years, 1940-1946 (2018)

Films
1987 Celebrating Bird: The Triumph of Charlie Parker
1990 Masters of American Music: Satchmo - Louis Armstrong aka Satchmo
2000 Contributor of interviews throughout the 10 part PBS series, Jazz by Ken Burns.
2014 Bing Crosby Rediscovered – American Masters

References

External links
 
 GaryGiddins.com (official website)

1948 births
Living people
Grinnell College alumni
American biographers
American male biographers
American columnists
American film directors
American music critics
American music journalists
Writers from New York (state)
Writers from Brooklyn
Jazz writers
Grammy Award winners
American Book Award winners